The 2023 Junior World Artistic Gymnastics Championships will be the second iteration of the Artistic Gymnastics Junior World Championships. They will be held in Antalya, Turkey from 29 March to 2 April 2023.

Competition schedule

Medals summary

Medalists

Medal standings

Overall

Boys

Girls

Qualifiers 
The top 36 national federations based on the results of the All-Around qualification from the 1st Junior World Championships in 2019 have qualified a full team (2-3 competitors). All other federations were allowed to send one male and/or one female gymnast to compete.

MAG

WAG

References 

World Artistic Gymnastics Championships
Junior World Gymnastics Championships
Artistic Gymnastics Junior World Championships
World Championships Junior
World Championships Junior
Gymnastics
Gymnastics competitions in Turkey
Artistic Gymnastics
Artistic Gymnastics